Mark Andrews may refer to:
 Mark Andrews (politician) (1926–2020), American politician from the state of North Dakota
 Mark Andrews (filmmaker) (born 1968), American filmmaker at Pixar Animation Studios
 Mark Andrews (rower) (born 1959), University boat race winner
 Mark Andrews (swimmer) (born 1965), Canadian swimmer
 Mark Andrews (rugby union) (born 1972), South African rugby player
 Sisqó (born Mark Andrews, born 1978), American R&B singer, lead singer of Dru Hill
 Mark E. Andrews (1903–1992), U.S. Assistant Secretary of the Navy
 Mark Andrews (wrestler) (born 1992), Welsh professional wrestler
 Mark Andrews (American football) (born 1995), American football player

See also
 Grand Forks International Airport, also known as Mark Andrews International Airport
 Mark Andrew, American businessman and politician